Eriogonum prattenianum is a species of wild buckwheat known by the common name Nevada City buckwheat.

Description
Eriogonum prattenianum is a small shrub growing up to about half a meter tall when erect in form or growing in a clump or mat lined with oval-shaped woolly leaves. The inflorescence arises on a slender scape and bears a rounded cluster of yellow flowers.

Distribution
Eriogonum prattenianum is endemic to California, where it can be found in many scattered disjunct populations in the Sierra Nevada and its foothills.

Taxonomy
There are two varieties of this species. The more common var. prattenianum occurs in scattered populations in the mountains and foothills, while the uncommon var. avium is limited to granite outcrops in the Sierra Nevada slopes of Madera and Fresno Counties. The latter is generally a smaller plant than the former.

External links
Jepson Manual Treatment - Eriogonum prattenianum
Eriogonum prattenianum Photo gallery

prattenianum
Endemic flora of California
Flora of the Sierra Nevada (United States)
Natural history of Nevada County, California
Flora without expected TNC conservation status